Tai is a Local Government Area (LGA) of Rivers State in Nigeria. It covers an area of 159 km2 and at the 2006 Census it had a population of 117,797. It is part of the Okrika/Oyigbo/Tai/Eleme constituency of the Nigerian Senate, represented since April 2007 by George Thompson Sekibo.
In the April 2007 elections the Tai LGA recorded an implausible 99.6% turnout for the Governorship election.
Celestine Omehia of the Rivers State People's Democratic Party was at first declared winner, but his election was later annulled and Rotimi Amaechi, also of the PDP, was declared governor.
In February 2009, the Chairman of Tai Local Government Area was Barry Mpigi.

Most of the people are Ogoni, speaking the Tee and Baan languages.
Communities include Ban-Ogoi, Bara-Ale, Bara-Alue, Barayira, Borobara (a central community), Botem, Bunu, Deeyor Kira, Gbam, 
Gbene-Ue, Horo, Kebara Kira, Korokoro (the seat of the Tai monarch), Koroma, Kpite, Nonwa Tai (Kebara), Nonwa Uedume, Orkpo, Sime and Ueken.
Other communities include Kporghor and Gio.

Tai Local government area has two broad sections: the Tua Tua Kingdom and the Barasi Nonwa Kingdom, both under the overall Tai kingdom headed by the Gbene Mene Tai. The primary occupations are farming, and fishing to a lesser degree. 
In September 2009, Samuel Nnee was the paramount ruler of the Kpite Community in Tai LGA.

There are many oil wells in the LGA, which is laced with pipelines, with most of the oil installations being operated by Shell Nigeria. However, the local community has seen little benefit from oil extraction, and infrastructure is poor.
In the 1990s, the Movement for the Survival of the Ogoni People began a struggle against the degradation of their lands, which at times erupted into violence. 
In June 2001 an oil pipeline that passes through the Baraale community ruptured and spilled crude oil into nearby forests, farmlands and houses. There were delays in repair, and in October 2001 the spilled oil caught fire, causing extensive environmental damage.
The region suffers from violence, kidnapping and arson.

References

Local Government Areas in Rivers State
1996 establishments in Nigeria
1990s establishments in Rivers State